Ezekiel the Tragedian – also known as Ezekiel the Dramatist and Ezekiel the Poet – was a Jewish dramatist who wrote in Alexandria. Naomi Yavneh has placed his work in the 3rd century BCE, while Howard Jacobson estimates the 2nd Century BCE.  Evidence of the date is not definitive. 

His only known work –  Exagōgē – is the earliest known Jewish play. It survives only in fragments found in the writings of Eusebius (PrEv 9, 28-29), Clement of Alexandria (Strom. 1.23.155f.), and Pseudo-Eustathius (Commentarius in Hexaemeron, PG 18, 729). Nevertheless, the extensive quotations by these writers make possible the assembly of 269 lines of text, about 20-25% of the whole. The only more extensive remnant of the Greco-Jewish poets is that found in the Sibylline Oracles.

Exagōgē is a five-act drama written in iambic trimeter, retelling of the biblical story of The Exodus from Egypt. Moses is the main character of the play, and parts of the biblical story have been altered to suit the narrative's needs. These changes probably point to Ezekiel's intention to stage the play, since certain scenes that are impossible to stage were converted into monologue. This drama is unique in blending the biblical story with the Hellenistic tragic drama.

The main modern edition is a parallel-text English-Greek edition by classical scholar Howard Jacobson.

References

Bibliography
 J. Allen, "Ezekiel the Tragedian on the Despoliation of Egypt," Journal for the Study of the Pseudepigrapha, 17.1 (2007), 3-19.
 Kristine J. Ruffatto, "Raguel as Interpreter of Moses' Throne Vision: The Transcendent Identity of Raguel in the Exagoge of Ezekiel the Tragedian", Journal for the Study of the Pseudepigrapha, 17.2 (2008), 121-139.
 Koskenniemi, Erkki, "Dramatic Miracles: Ezekiel the Tragedian", in: The Old Testament miracle-workers in early Judaism, Mohr Siebeck, 2005, pp. 64-86
 Brant, Jo-Ann A., "Mimesis and Dramatic Art in Ezekiel the Tragedians’ Exagoge", in: Ancient fiction: the matrix of early Christian and Jewish narrative, Society of Biblical Literature, 2005, pp: 129-148
 Jacobson, Howard, The Exagoge of Ezekiel, Cambridge University Press, 1983

Ancient Greek dramatists and playwrights
Jews of Ptolemaic Alexandria
Hellenistic Jewish writers
Jewish dramatists and playwrights
Ancient Egyptian writers
2nd-century BC people